Ford Palace was a residence of the Archbishops of Canterbury at Ford, about  north-east of Canterbury and  south-east of Herne Bay, in the parish of Hoath in the county of Kent in south-eastern England. The earliest structural evidence for the palace dates it to about 1300, and the earliest written references to it date to the 14th century. However, its site may have been in use for similar purposes since the Anglo-Saxon period, and it may have been the earliest such residence outside Canterbury.

Archbishop John Morton (1486–1500) rebuilt the palace, adding a five-storey tower of brick, and Thomas Cranmer was visited there by King Henry VIII in 1544. In 1573 Archbishop Matthew Parker proposed to demolish it, but it survived to be surveyed in 1647 by commissioners acting on the instructions of the Long Parliament, which had acquired it from the Church of England. The survey found the palace to be in fair condition, but it was largely demolished and the materials sold by order of Parliament in 1658, while the see of Canterbury was vacant. Its site was returned to the Church after the Restoration. In 1661, what remained of it was described as so ruined that its chapel was in use as a barn.

Toponymy
"Ford" is a common place-name element in England, and refers to a shallow crossing of a river or stream.

History

Origin
Five 2nd-century, Roman cremation burials were found near the same location. Finds from the Anglo-Saxon period include a claw beaker and a drinking cup retrieved from a sand pit also to the south of the stream, between the site of Ford Palace and that of the cremation burials.

However, archaeological excavation has shown no evidence of this, and Æthelberht's connection with Reculver may be no more than a product of legend. In 2001 the historian Harold Gough noted speculation that the king may instead have taken up residence at Ford, since it lay on the Roman road between Canterbury and Reculver, and was included in the estate centred on Reculver that was given by King Ecgberht of Kent to Bassa the mass-priest for the foundation of St Mary's Church, Reculver, in 669. Ford was also included in the Reculver estate when King Eadred gave it to Archbishop Oda of Canterbury in 949. In 1800 the historian Edward Hasted wrote that Ford Palace "appears to have been the most antient palace, excepting that of Canterbury, which had been erected for the archiepiscopal residence", described it as "parcel of the antient possessions of the see of Canterbury", and placed its establishment "probably on lands given to [the archiepiscopate] sometime before the Norman conquest". Gough noted further that there is not "a shred of documentary or archaeological evidence" for the palace's existence in the Anglo-Saxon period.

The first indication of the existence of an archiepiscopal residence at Ford is in documents issued there in the 14th and 15th centuries. However, part of the main structure that stood until 1964 "embodied a string-course scroll moulding which suggested a late-Decorated date of around 1300", and there may have been an earlier, moated site adjacent to the palace's southern side.

Archbishop Morton
Although no relevant documentation survives, a major phase of construction work at Ford Palace is attributed to Archbishop John Morton (1479 – 1500). Hasted believed that Morton "almost rebuilt the whole of [the palace]", and the architectural historians Cecil Hewett and Tim Tatton-Brown, in discussing bricks used in the tower known as "Bell Harry" at Canterbury Cathedral between 1494 and 1497, compared them to those found at Ford, where they wrote that Morton "built himself a palace." Morton instigated a great deal of building-work during his clerical career, to the extent that he obtained a royal commission to press-gang stonemasons, bricklayers and other construction workers into his service. But Gough remarked that any building-work attributed to him at Ford would probably consist of brick. Ford Manor farmhouse includes brick- and stonework of varying dates, among them remains of the palace's gatehouse; a section of brick wall from the palace's garden also survives. Other parts of the palace complex considered to be Morton's work include a five-storey brick accommodation tower, of which nothing remains above ground, and a stable block: the site of the stables is now occupied by a barn, parts of which are of early Tudor date.

Archbishop Cranmer
Gough wrote that Archbishop Thomas Cranmer (1533 – 1555) "seems to have been particularly attached to [Ford Palace], ... [involving it] inextricably with the progress of the English Reformation." He was at the palace in 1535 when he wrote to King Henry VIII concerning the prior of Blackfriars, Canterbury, who had objected to his preaching against the Pope, and in 1536, when he wrote to Thomas Cromwell regarding a question of consanguinity. The year after, Cranmer left Lambeth Palace for Ford to escape an instance of plague, having concluded a meeting of bishops that had been deliberating on the text of the "Bishops' Book", which was to become the basis for the Thirty-Nine Articles of Religion. In August the same year he was at Ford when he received copies of the Matthew Bible from the printer Richard Grafton, and he wrote from there to commend it to Thomas Cromwell. In 1538 he appointed Nicholas Ridley, with whom he became one of the Oxford Martyrs in 1555, to the neighbouring vicarage of Herne. In the summer of 1552 he was at Croydon Palace with Ridley, working on the Forty-Two Articles of Religion, but withdrew to Ford in October suffering from a fever. On 24 November, still at Ford, he dispatched a version of the Articles that he had reviewed and annotated to the Privy Council. Evidently Cranmer viewed Ford Palace as "a retreat from the unhealthy atmosphere of the London area, near enough to Canterbury without actually being in the city, where religion and politics sometimes formed a dangerous mixture"; and it was at the palace, in June 1544, that Cranmer received a visit from King Henry, who was on his way from London to France. The King stayed there overnight, before continuing to Dover. But, during the English Counter-Reformation under Queen Mary I, it was also at Ford Palace that Cranmer received orders to appear before the Privy Council, leading to his execution in 1556.

Decline and demolition
The first archbishop of Canterbury after the Elizabethan Religious Settlement of 1559, Matthew Parker (1559 –1575), disliked Ford Palace to the extent that he wanted it partly demolished,  and the residences at Bekesbourne and Canterbury to benefit from the spoils. The estate was leased to the keeper as a farm, but, seeking Queen Elizabeth I's authority for a major change to the buildings, Parker wrote to the then Lord High Treasurer, William Cecil, in March 1573, describing Ford Palace as "an old, decayed, wasteful, unwholesome, and desolate house". The matter remained undecided when Parker died in May 1575.

Hasted and Hook believed that Archbishop John Whitgift (1583 – 1604) hunted frequently in Ford Park, but Gough demurred, stating that the belief is not supported by any evidence. Archbishop George Abbot (1611 – 1633), who accidentally shot and killed a park-keeper at Bramshill Park in 1621, was forced to withdraw from his archiepiscopal duties by King Charles I in 1627 and retired temporarily to Ford. Several instances are recorded when Abbot appointed individuals to the office of park-keeper at Ford between 1613 and 1624, and between 1631 and 1632 he spent £11.15s.6d (£11.78) on repairs there, although he regarded it as a "moorish", or marshy, place.

In 1647, during the English Civil War, Ford was surveyed on behalf of Parliament, which had acquired it from the Church of England, and found to be in reasonable repair. The whole estate was said to be worth a rent of £43.10s. (£43.50), and the value of the materials of all the buildings was put at £820, were they "to be sold ... and taken away". The palace was largely demolished by order of Parliament in 1658, while the see of Canterbury was vacant, and the materials were sold for £840. The estate was returned to the see after the Restoration of 1660, and a report made in 1661 states that "Ford pallace is so much ruonated as if the author therein did count it merit to make such destruction; the mannor house [is] totaly cast down [and] the Chapell made a barne". In 1667 the original barn and the gatehouse were reported as dilapidated, and in 1668 it was reported that the tenant of the remainder of the estate, not including the barn and gatehouse, had continued the demolition and sold "six or seven loads of the best stone". At about the same time tiles were sold from Ford to the churchwardens of nearby Herne. Although the remains of the palace continued to be quarried for materials or adapted, parts of the palace hall and chapel stood until 1964, when they were demolished in preparation for a new farm building.

Archaeology

While incidental finds on the site of Ford Palace include part of a Roman inscription and Roman coins, very little active archaeology has been undertaken there. In 2011 four circular holes  in diameter were drilled in connection with proposed construction work slightly to the east of the palace site, but nothing of archaeological interest was found. At about the same time, further exploration at the eastern end of the site uncovered "two substantial brick and mortar walls of unknown date". Several structures that probably formed part of the palace remain above ground. Parts of Ford Manor farmhouse, which stands on the site of the palace gatehouse and is adjacent to the public road, date to the 15th and 17th centuries.

References

Footnotes

Notes

Bibliography

 

Christianity in Kent
Episcopal palaces of archbishops of Canterbury
Ruined palaces
Ruins in Kent